Coffee Mate is a 2016 South Korean melodrama film written and directed by Yi Hyun-ha, starring Yoon Jin-seo and Oh Ji-ho.

Premise
In-young is a housewife whose conventional life consists of spending time in a café. At the café, she meets Hee-soo, a carpenter, who suggests In-young that they become "coffee mates" - friends who only meet at the café and no contact via phone calls and message texts. As the meetings become more frequent, In-young and Hee-soo begin sharing their daily routines and personal secrets. Soon they find themselves having grown feelings for each other.

Cast
 Yoon Jin-seo as In-young
 Oh Ji-ho as Hee-soo
 Kim Min-seo as Yoon-jo
 Lee Seon-ho as Won-yeong
 Kim Jin-yeop as Young Hee-soo
 Ha Si-yeon as Young In-young
 Kim Ji-sung as Young Yoon-jae 
 Nam Dong-ha as Yoon-jo's father
 Yoo Pil-ran as Yoon-jo's mother

Release
The film premiered on October 7, 2016, at the 21st Busan International Film Festival, and went on general release in South Korea on March 1, 2017.

References

External links

Coffee Mate at Naver Movies 

South Korean romantic drama films
2016 films
2016 romantic drama films
2010s South Korean films
2010s Korean-language films